Thomas Curson Hansard (6 November 17765 May 1833) was an English pressman, son of the printer Luke Hansard.

Life
In 1803, he established a press of his own in Paternoster Row.  In the same year, William Cobbett, a newspaperman, began to print the Parliamentary Debates.  At first, these were not independent reports, but were taken from newspapers' accounts of parliamentary debate.

In 1809, Hansard started to print Cobbett's reports.  Together, they also published a pamphlet describing an incident in which German mercenaries had flogged British soldiers for mutiny; as a result Hansard was imprisoned on 9 July 1810 in King's Bench Prison for libel.
In 1812, facing bankruptcy, Cobbett sold the publication to Hansard, who continued to publish it for the rest of his life.  In 1829, he added his own name to the parliamentary proceedings, giving it the title Hansard that it bears to this day.

TC Hansard was the author of Typographia, an Historical Sketch of the Origin and Progress of the Art of Printing (1825).

Hansard is buried in Kingston Cemetery.

Firm
The original business remained in the hands of his younger brothers, James and Luke Graves Hansard (1777–1851). The firm was prosecuted in 1837 by John Joseph Stockdale for printing by order of the House of Commons, in an official report of the inspector of prisons, statements regarded by the plaintiff as libellous. Hansard's sheltered itself on the ground of parliamentary privilege, but it was not until after much litigation that the security of the printers of government reports was guaranteed by statute in 1840.

After 1889 the debates were published by the Hansard Publishing Union Limited.

References

External links 
 A history of Hansard from The Australasian and Pacific Hansard Editors' Association
 

1776 births
1833 deaths
English printers